Pediococcus claussenii is a species of Gram-positive bacteria. Like other Pediococcus species, P. claussenii is implicated in the spoilage of fermented beverages due to its production of diacetyl. Strains of this species were originally isolated from spoiled beer.

The genome of P. claussenii strain ATCC BAA-344 has been sequenced.

References

External links
Type strain of Pediococcus claussenii at BacDive -  the Bacterial Diversity Metadatabase

Lactobacillaceae
Bacteria described in 2002